Lawrence T. Wos (1930–2020) was an American mathematician, a researcher in the Mathematics and Computer Science Division of Argonne National Laboratory.

Biography

Wos studied at the University of Chicago, receiving a bachelor's degree in 1950 and a master's in mathematics in 1954, and went on for doctoral studies at the University of Illinois at Urbana-Champaign where he received PhD in 1957 supervised by Reinhold Baer. He joined the Argonne in 1957, and began using computers to prove mathematical theorems in 1963.

Wos was congenitally blind. He was an avid bowler, the best male blind bowler in the US.

Awards and honors
In 1982, Wos and his colleague Steve Winker were the first to win the Automated Theorem Proving Prize, given by the American Mathematical Society.
In 1992, Wos was the first to win the Herbrand Award for his contributions to the field of automated deduction. A festschrift in his honor, Automated reasoning and its applications: essays in honor of Larry Wos (Robert Veroff, ed.) was published by the MIT Press in 1997.

Books
Wos and Gail W. Pieper are the coauthors of the books A Fascinating Country in the World of Computing: Your Guide to Automated Reasoning (World Scientific, 1999) and Automated Reasoning and the Discovery of Missing and Elegant Proofs (Rinton Press, 2003). Wos's collected works were published by World Scientific in 2000, in two volumes.

References

External links
 
Publication list at DBLP
 Maria Paola Bonacina (with Franz Baader, Alan Bundy, Ulrich Furbach, Frank Pfenning, John Slaney, and Christoph Weidenbach), "In Memoriam: Larry Wos"

Blind academics
Academics from Chicago
20th-century American mathematicians
21st-century American mathematicians
University of Chicago alumni
University of Illinois Urbana-Champaign alumni
1930 births
2020 deaths